The Secret Life of Us is an Australian television drama. It premiered on Network Ten on 16 July 2001. The show traces the lives of eight twenty-somethings sharing a Melbourne apartment block who are all looking for the same thing — love, sex, romance, success — and anything else that's worth going after. The problem is they haven't worked out how to get it yet — so they make it up as they go along.

Series overview

Episodes

Season 1 (2001)

Season 2 (2002)

Season 3 (2003)

Season 4 (2004–2005)

References

Secret Life of Us
Secret Life of Us